The SEQ Water Grid Manager, a former statutory authority of the Government of Queensland, was in operation between 2008 and 2012. During this period, the agency was responsible for managing the strategic operation of the SEQ Water Grid, including issues such as water security and water quality for the region in a cost-effective manner, while balancing the needs of the community and the environment.

Activities and functions
Whilst in operation, the SEQ Water Grid Manager purchased the services to store, treat, produce and transport bulk water from Seqwater and LinkWater to sell to SEQ Water Grid customers - council-owned, businesses and power stations.

To manage the operations of the SEQ Water Grid and maintain water security, it made daily decisions about water demand; and based on those projections supplies treated water to the SEQ Water Grid to meet the needs of communities and businesses. The SEQ Water Grid Manager was also responsible for ensuring safe, secure and efficient water is delivered to SEQ Water Grid customers; managing the SEQ Water Grid's debt profile; implementing a whole-of-Grid risk management framework; and implementing whole-of-Grid improvement projects.

Seqwater assumed the function of the SEQ Water Grid Manager on 1 January 2013.

See also

 SEQ Water Grid
 Seqwater
 Queensland Water Commission
 Water supply and sanitation in Australia
 Water security in Australia

External links
 SEQ Water Grid
 Seqwater

Water companies of Queensland
Water management in Queensland
Government agencies of Queensland
South East Queensland
2008 establishments in Australia
2012 disestablishments in Australia
Government agencies disestablished in 2012
Government agencies established in 2008